Claverack Creek is a  tributary to Stockport Creek in Columbia County, New York, in the United States. Its source is in the town of Claverack at the hamlet of Mellenville, and its mouth is at its confluence with Kinderhook Creek to form Stockport Creek, in the town of Stockport.

History
The lower Claverack Creek was known as Twastawekak (To-was-ta-we-kak or Twastaweekak) by the Native American Mahican tribe, while the upper creek was named Ska-an-kook or Skaanpook.

Tributaries
 Fitting Creek
 Widows Creek
 Mud Creek
 Taghkanic Creek
 Mud Creek
 Snydam Creek
 Chrysler Pond Outlet
 Loomis Creek
 Hollowville Creek
 North Creek
 Agawamuck Creek

See also
List of rivers of New York

References

Rivers of Columbia County, New York
Rivers of New York (state)
Tributaries of the Hudson River